The 1964 NBA playoffs was the postseason tournament of the National Basketball Association's 1963–64 season. The tournament concluded with the Eastern Division champion Boston Celtics defeating the Western Division champion San Francisco Warriors 4 games to 1 in the NBA Finals.

Boston earned their 6th straight and 7th overall NBA title, as they continued to dominate the decade; except for 1967, they won every NBA title in the 1960s.

This was the San Francisco Warriors' first trip to the NBA Finals since 1956 when they were based in Philadelphia; they would make a repeat appearance in 1967 and (as the Golden State Warriors) would earn the franchise's third championship in 1975.

The Philadelphia 76ers earned their first playoff appearance in their new city; they had been founded as the independent Syracuse Nationals in 1939 and joined the NBL in 1946.

Bracket

Division Semifinals

Eastern Division Semifinals

(2) Cincinnati Royals vs. (3) Philadelphia 76ers

This was the second playoff meeting between these two teams, with the Royals winning the first meeting when the 76ers were the Syracuse Nationals.

Western Division Semifinals

(2) St. Louis Hawks vs. (3) Los Angeles Lakers

This was the seventh playoff meeting between these two teams, with the Hawks winning four of the first six meetings.

Division Finals

Eastern Division Finals

(1) Boston Celtics vs. (2) Cincinnati Royals

This was the second playoff meeting between these two teams, with the Celtics winning the first meeting.

Western Division Finals

(1) San Francisco Warriors vs. (2) St. Louis Hawks
This is the only playoff game that was held in the San Francisco city limit until 2022.

This was the first playoff meeting between these two teams.

NBA Finals: (E1) Boston Celtics vs. (W1) San Francisco Warriors

This was the fourth playoff meeting between these two teams, with the Celtics winning the first three meetings when the Warriors were based in Philadelphia.

See also
1964 NBA Finals
1963–64 NBA season

References

External links 
RetroSeasons.com's 1964 NBA Playoffs page

National Basketball Association playoffs
Playoffs

fi:NBA-kausi 1963–1964#Pudotuspelit